Allasio is an Italian surname. Notable people with the surname include:

Federico Allasio (1914–1987), Italian footballer
Marisa Allasio (born 1936), Italian actress

Italian-language surnames